Hans Graber (18 June 1930 – 17 April 2008) was a Swiss rower. He competed in the men's eight event at the 1960 Summer Olympics.

References

1930 births
2008 deaths
Swiss male rowers
Olympic rowers of Switzerland
Rowers at the 1960 Summer Olympics
Rowers from Zürich